John Paton Laurie (25 March 1897 – 23 June 1980) was a Scottish actor. In the course of his career, Laurie performed on the stage and in films as well as television. He is perhaps best remembered for his role in the sitcom Dad's Army (1968-1977) as Private Frazer, a member of the Home Guard.

Laurie appeared in scores of feature films with directors such as Alfred Hitchcock, Michael Powell, and Laurence Olivier, generally playing memorable small or supporting roles rather than leading ones. As a stage actor, he was cast in Shakespearean roles and was a speaker of verse, especially of Robert Burns.

Early life
John Paton Laurie was born on 25 March 1897 in Dumfries, Dumfriesshire to William Laurie (1856–1903), a clerk in a tweed mill and later a hatter and hosier, and Jessie Ann Laurie (née Brown; 1858–1935). Laurie attended Dumfries Academy (a grammar school at the time), before abandoning a career in architecture to serve in the First World War as a member of the Honourable Artillery Company. Upon his demobilisation, he trained to become an actor under Elsie Fogerty at the Central School of Speech and Drama, then based at the Royal Albert Hall, London and first acted on stage in 1921.

Career

Theatre and radio
A prolific Shakespearean actor, Laurie made his first appearance on the London stage in 1922 at the Old Vic where he played many leading roles. Soon after joining the Old Vic Laurie became involved with the Shakespeare Memorial Theatre in Stratford-upon-Avon where he played such roles as Richard III, Othello and Macbeth. In only his second season at Stratford, Laurie got the chance to play Hamlet, which was almost unheard of for someone with such little experience. Laurie later said that he believed that his performance of the role was the definitive version, saying ‘That’s the way to play Hamlet, don’t wait too long, like some of the boys are doing today.’

On radio, he created the role of John the Baptist in Dorothy L Sayers' cycle of plays The Man Born to Be King, and reprised the role in two further versions of the cycle. Laurie also played the part of MacDuff in a radio adaptation of "Macbeth", with Ralph Richardson playing the title role.

TV and film

Laurie's first film was the 1930 film Juno and the Paycock, which was directed by Alfred Hitchcock. Hitchcock did not forget Laurie and cast him in the role of John the Crofter in what would become the actor's breakthrough third film, The 39 Steps in 1935. Laurie had first met Laurence Olivier at the Old Vic and went on to make their first film appearance together in the 1936 adaptation of As You Like It. Laurie went on to appear in Olivier's three Shakespearean films, Henry V (1944), Hamlet (1948), and Richard III (1955). During the Second World War, Laurie served in the Home Guard, experience that would be useful for later projects. Other roles included Peter Manson in Michael Powell's The Edge of the World (1937), Clive Candy's batman in Powell and Pressburger's The Life and Death of Colonel Blimp (1943), a gardener in Medal for the General (1944), the farmer recruit in The Way Ahead (1944), and the brothel proprietor in Fanny by Gaslight (1944).  In the film I Know Where I'm Going! (1945), another Powell and Pressburger production, Laurie had a small speaking part in a céilidh sequence for which he was also credited as an adviser. In the next decade, he played the psychiatrist Dr. James Garsten in Mine Own Executioner (1947), the repugnant Pew in Disney's Treasure Island (1950), Angus in Pandora and the Flying Dutchman (1951), and Dr. MacFarlane in Hobson's Choice (1954).

In 1954, Laurie joined the Edinburgh Gateway Company to play the leading role in Robert Kemp's The Laird o' Grippy, a translation into Scots of Molière's L'avare.

Laurie's role as Private Frazer, the gaunt-faced, intense, pessimistic undertaker, and British Home Guard soldier in the sitcom Dad's Army (1968–1977) remains his best known TV role. Dad’s Army co-star Frank Williams noted in his autobiography that Laurie had ‘a sort of love-hate relationship with the show’, as despite earning him a lot a money he felt that a sitcom was beneath him. Laurie had also gained a reputation on set for being somewhat of a pessimist; Graham McCann said in his book Dad’s Army: The Story of a Very British Comedy, said: “John Laurie was cantankerous, he was rather mischievous, he was someone who enjoyed playing a kind of a professional pessimist.” He featured in many British series of the 1950s, 1960s, and 1970s including Tales of Mystery, Doctor Finlay's Casebook, and The Avengers.

Laurie starred as Mad Peter in the Hammer film The Reptile (1966), and later appeared in The Abominable Dr. Phibes (1971), the Disney film One of Our Dinosaurs is Missing (1975), and The Prisoner of Zenda (1979). One of his last appearances was in Return to the Edge of the World (1978), in which Michael Powell revisited his film of forty years before. Laurie's final work was in the BBC Radio 2 comedy series Tony's (1979) along with Victor Spinetti and Deborah Watling.

Personal life
Laurie was married twice; his first wife, Florence May Saunders, whom he had met at the Old Vic, died from meningitis in 1926. His second wife was Oonah Veronica Todd-Naylor, who survived him. Together they had a daughter, Veronica (1939–2022).

Death

Laurie died aged 83 from emphysema in the Chalfont and Gerrards Cross Hospital, Chalfont St Peter, Buckinghamshire.. His widow Oonah (1901–1990) died ten years later. His body was cremated and his ashes were scattered at sea.

Filmography

Partial television credits

References

External links

John Laurie BFI
Letter from John Laurie at BBC archive

1897 births
1980 deaths
Alumni of the Royal Central School of Speech and Drama
British Army personnel of World War I
Deaths from emphysema
Honourable Artillery Company soldiers
People educated at Dumfries Academy
People from Dumfries
British male comedy actors
Scottish male film actors
Scottish male stage actors
Scottish male television actors
People from Chalfont St Giles
20th-century Scottish male actors
Scottish male Shakespearean actors
British Home Guard soldiers